Left for Dead in Malaysia is an album by the alternative comedian Neil Hamburger. It was released by Drag City in 1999.

Critical reception
The A.V. Club wrote: "Like Hamburger's first two albums, Left For Dead mercilessly exposes, exaggerates, and satirizes the unnatural, formalized conventions of stand-up comedy: the forced joviality, the manufactured intimacy, the contrived nature of joke-telling, and the sort of theatrical masochism of an art form that requires its participants to confess their failures as human beings, then derive humor from their own shortcomings."

Track listing

"Introduction" (1:19) 
"Selamat Malam" (0:48)
"Spice Girls" (0:27)
"Transcending the Language Barrier" (2:53)
"The Cola Wars" (1:02)
"Murphy's Law" (0:52)
"Sales Reps' Conventions" (1:52)
"Swingers' Parties" (1:58)
"Necrophilia" (0:19)
"Divorce" (2:59) 
"Dentists" (1:47)
"Come and Visit" (0:58)
"Cremation" (1:05)
"Kenny Rogers" (0:56)
"Colonel Sanders" (0:37)
"Neil' Will" (0:54)
"Other Comedians" (0:54)
"Dating" (0:25)
"Inspirtation" (0:59)
"A.A." (1:30)
"Montezuma's Revenge" (2:44)
"Music" (2:01)
"Religious Humor" (2:37)
"Metric System/Oriental Massage" (1:11)
"Lotto Numbers" (2:17)
"Just Checking" (0:28)
"Antarctica/New Jokes" (1:55)
"Changing Times" (1:44)

References

Gregg Turkington albums
Drag City (record label) albums
1999 albums